Strengths and weaknesses may refer to:

Strengths and weaknesses (personality)
SWOT analysis, analysing strengths and weaknesses in strategic planning
Strengths and weaknesses of evolution

See also
 Weakness (disambiguation)
 Strength (disambiguation)